TV Red de Puerto Rico, Inc. is a local owner of low-power television stations in Puerto Rico and the U.S. Virgin Islands. These stations carry programming from religious broadcaster La Cadena del Milagro Internacional. Headquartered in San Juan, TV Red is one of the largest station groups in Puerto Rico in terms of numbers of stations owned.

Television stations

These stations are licensed to TV Red de Puerto Rico, Inc.

External links

Companies based in San Juan, Puerto Rico
Digital television in the United States
Television broadcasting companies of the United States